Colquitt County is a county in the U.S. state of Georgia. As of the 2020 census, the population was  45,898. The county seat is Moultrie. The county was created on February 25, 1856, and is named for Walter Terry Colquitt, a U.S. senator. Colquitt County comprises the Moultrie, GA Micropolitan Statistical Area.

Geography

Most of the western portion of Colquitt County, west of Moultrie and State Route 33, is located in the Upper Ochlockonee River sub-basin of the larger Ochlockonee River basin, with the exception of the very northwestern corner of the county, between Sale City and west of Doerun, which is located in the Lower Flint River sub-basin of the ACF River Basin (Apalachicola-Chattahoochee-Flint River Basin). A narrow central portion of Colquitt County, running from north to south of Moultrie, and then widening to occupy the gap between U.S. Route 319 and State Route 133, is located in the Withlacoochee River sub-basin of the Suwannee River basin. The eastern portion of the county is located in the Little River sub-basin of the same Suwannee River basin.

Lakes
 Gray Lake
 Lake Murphy

Major highways

  U.S. Route 319
 U.S. Route 319 Business
  State Route 33
  State Route 35
  State Route 37
  State Route 111
  State Route 133
  State Route 202
  State Route 256
  State Route 270
  State Route 270 Spur

Adjacent counties
 Tift County (northeast)
 Cook County (east)
 Brooks County (southeast)
 Thomas County (southwest)
 Mitchell County (west)
 Worth County (northwest)

Demographics

2000 census
As of the census of 2000, there were 42,053 people, 15,495 households, and 11,063 families living in the county. The population density was 76 people per square mile (29/km2). There were 17,554 housing units at an average density of 32 per square mile (12/km2). The racial makeup of the county was 67.78% White, 23.47% Black or African American, 0.29% Native American, 0.25% Asian, 0.04% Pacific Islander, 7.05% from other races, and 1.12% from two or more races. 10.83% of the population were Hispanic or Latino of any race.

There were 15,495 households, out of which 34.60% had children under the age of 18 living with them, 51.00% were married couples living together, 15.50% had a female householder with no husband present, and 28.60% were non-families. 24.90% of all households were made up of individuals, and 11.20% had someone living alone who was 65 years of age or older. The average household size was 2.63 and the average family size was 3.12.

In the county, the population was spread out, with 27.40% under the age of 18, 10.30% from 18 to 24, 28.00% from 25 to 44, 21.40% from 45 to 64, and 12.90% who were 65 years of age or older. The median age was 34 years. For every 100 females there were 98.10 males. For every 100 females age 18 and over, there were 95.50 males.

The median income for a household in the county was $28,539, and the median income for a family was $34,792. Males had a median income of $26,588 versus $20,155 for females. The per capita income for the county was $14,457. About 16.10% of families and 19.80% of the population were below the poverty line, including 25.70% of those under age 18 and 19.60% of those age 65 or over.

2008 estimates
According to Census Bureau estimates in 2008, Colquitt County had a population that was 75.3% whites, 22.9% African-American and 16.0% Latino.

2010 census
As of the 2010 United States Census, there were 45,498 people, 16,317 households, and 11,696 families living in the county. The racial makeup of the county was 64.7% white, 22.4% black or African American, 0.6% Asian, 0.5% American Indian, 10.3% from other races, and 1.4% from two or more races. Those of Hispanic or Latino origin made up 17.1% of the population. In terms of ancestry, 19.6% were American, 8.4% were Irish, and 6.8% were English.

Of the 16,317 households, 38.9% had children under the age of 18 living with them, 48.7% were married couples living together, 17.3% had a female householder with no husband present, 28.3% were non-families, and 24.0% of all households were made up of individuals. The average household size was 2.73 and the average family size was 3.21. The median age was 34.8 years.

The median income for a household in the county was $32,902 and the median income for a family was $39,086. Males had a median income of $28,912 versus $24,199 for females. The per capita income for the county was $17,362. About 18.8% of families and 23.4% of the population were below the poverty line, including 32.7% of those under age 18 and 16.8% of those age 65 or over.

2020 census

As of the 2020 United States Census, there were 45,898 people, 15,505 households, and 10,663 families residing in the county.

Education

Colquitt County School District operates public schools, with Colquitt County High School being the high school.

Communities

Cities

 Berlin
 Doerun
 Ellenton
 Funston
 Moultrie
 Norman Park

Unincorporated communities
 Autreyville
 Barbers
 Hartsfield
 Riverside

Politics

See also

 National Register of Historic Places listings in Colquitt County, Georgia
List of counties in Georgia

References

External links
 Colquitt County official website
 Colquitt County historical marker

 
1856 establishments in Georgia (U.S. state)
Georgia (U.S. state) counties
Populated places established in 1856